The Schaffhausen trolleybus system is part of the public transport network of Schaffhausen, capital city of the canton of Schaffhausen, Switzerland, and the adjacent town of Neuhausen am Rheinfall in the same canton. It is also Switzerland's youngest and smallest such system. Its route, designated as line 1, connects among others Schaffhausen railway station with the Rhine Falls.

Opened in 1966, the system replaced the Schaffhausen tramway network. , it consists of one cross-city route.

With 3.45 million passengers annually (as of 2011), the trolleybus line is by far the busiest of all the operator's routes.

History

Origins and extensions 
The conversion of the Schaffhausen Waldfriedhof–Neuhausen Zentrum tramway to trolleybus operation was the consequence of a popular vote (referendum) held on 13 September 1964.  The changeover occurred seamlessly, over the break between 23 and 24 September 1966.  However, the trolleybus line that emerged from the tramway line ran initially only as far as Ebnat, whereas the tramway had continued one stop further, to the Waldfriedhof (forest cemetery) in St. Niklausen. At first, the trolleybuses operated every ten minutes at normal times, and every five minutes during peak times.

The trolleybus system also took over the former tram depot, which was then at Cardinal, on the site of today's central fire station.
 
Only in the spring of 1970 was the trolleybus system extended to reach St. Niklausen, as the tramway had done.

Upon the opening of this section, the VBSH put a second trolleybus route into operation: Line 9, Neuhausen Zentrum–Herblingertal. This was a reinforcement line that ran only in peak times, and was served by four rigid (two-axle) buses. Line 9 replaced the additional bus rounds on line 1 in peak times, and also served exclusively the new section in the Herblingertal, where no public transport was available outside line 9's operating hours.

On 4 August 1980, there was an extension at the other end of the system, when the section from Neuhausen Zentrum to Neuhausen Herbstäcker went into operation.  At Herbstäcker, another balloon loop was constructed; trolleybuses ran through it counter clock-wise, and with a longer stay at the terminus. The opening of this extension led to the introduction of a third route number, because not all services ran through to Herbstäcker.  Services running only as far as Neuhausen Zentrum were henceforth known as line 2; meanwhile, line 9 was unaffected by the extension, and continued to terminate at Neuhausen Zentrum.

On 31 May 1987, the VBSH opened a new trolleybus and motor bus depot in the Herblingertal, at Ebnatstrasse 145. The depot, which remains in use today, replaced the old depot from the tramway era, and was originally connected with the rest of the trolleybus system via the overhead wires of line 9.

Further developments
Since the end of the 1980s, route number 2 has no longer been used. However, some services, designated as line 1, continue to terminate at Neuhausen Zentrum; they are scheduled on weekends and holidays.

In 1991/92, Schaffhausen's first generation trolleybus fleet of Berna vehicles was replaced with a new fleet, of NAW/Hess articulated units.

On 20 September 1995, line 9 was discontinued, after 21 years of operation. Since then, the former line 9 route has been served by motor bus route 6, which also serves the affected section in the Herblingertal only in peak times. To compensate for the shutdown of line 9, line 1 services were increased, to run at 7.5-minute intervals during rush hour.

Until 14 December 2003, motor bus line 6, which also ran to Neuhausen, was diverted during peak times to combine with line 1 to offer a service at condensed, 7.5-minute intervals. Since then, the Schaffhausen trolleybuses have run all day on a rigid timetable of one trolleybus every ten minutes.
 
From 1 July 2007 to 22 September 2008, the former level crossing on the High Rhine Railway was replaced by an underpass. During the conversion work for this alteration, trolleybuses could run only to Neuhausen Zentrum, and the remaining section of the line was served for one year by replacement rigid motor buses. However, the trolleybus system ultimately benefited from this work, as the level crossing barriers had previously hampered its operation.

Revitalisation 
In the first decade of the 21st century, the continued existence of the Schaffhausen trolleybus system was called into question, on grounds of cost.  The feasibility of switching to either diesel buses or gas powered buses was examined in detail.  However, and following thorough discussions, the City Council decided in 2008, for ecological reasons – and despite the slightly higher operating costs – to retain the electrically powered bus services. In September 2008, the City Parliament voted in favour of a corresponding resolution, paving the way for the acquisition of new low-floor articulated trolleybuses.

On 1 May 2010, Elektrizitätswerk des Kantons Schaffhausen AG (EKS AG) took over from the Verkehrsbetriebe Schaffhausen the responsibility for maintenance of the trolleybus overhead wires.

Meanwhile, planning has begun for a second trolleybus line. Such a conversion would almost double the length of the overhead wire network.

Route 
, Schaffhausen's single trolleybus route, designated as line 1, connected the Waldfriedhof in the town of Schaffhausen with the Herbstäcker residential area in the neighbouring municipality of Neuhausen am Rheinfall. Thus, it also connected the town with the Rhine Falls, a major tourist attraction.

Fleet

First generation (Berna) 

Schaffhausen's first generation trolleybuses, procured in 1966, were made by Berna, a Swiss manufacturer. They consisted of five articulated buses, nos. 101 to 105, and five rigid (two-axle) buses, nos. 201 to 205. As not all of these vehicles had been completed by time the system was opened, similar vehicles from the Winterthur trolleybus system were used initially to help out.

After the first generation vehicles were withdrawn from service in 1991/1992, three of them – nos. 102, 103 and 203 – were transferred to the Valparaíso trolleybus system in Chile, in December 1992. There, no. 203 is still in use, but no. 102 was retired in 2009 as a result of a technical malfunction. Meanwhile, no. 101 was scrapped, and no. 104 went to Winterthur as spare parts.  No. 202 now belongs to the Trolleybusverein Schweiz (Swiss Trolleybus Society) (TVS).

An eleventh articulated vehicle, no. 106, was procured in 1975 during the launch of line 9.  Manufactured by Volvo - and similar to some of the buses in the Lucerne trolleybus system's fleet - it remained a unique item in Schaffhausen, and in 1999 was sold to Lucerne for spare parts.

In 1980, due to the extension of the system to Herbstäcker, two used rigid vehicles, both built in 1961, made their way from Lucerne to Schaffhausen. With a total of 13 trolleybuses, the Schaffhausen fleet thus reached its historical peak. The two ex-Lucerne vehicles, nos. 206 (formerly Lucerne 226) and 207 (formerly Lucerne 227) were in service until 1991.

Second generation (NAW/Hess) 

The second generation vehicles, of type BGT 5-25, were built in 1991/1992.  They replaced the 1966-built vehicles, and the two ex-Lucerne buses.  A joint production of the Swiss companies Carrosserie Hess, NAW and ABB, they were given the fleet nos. 111 to 118. 
 
One of the BGT 5-25s, no. 114, was laid up in late 2007, and thereafter served as a source of spare parts.  It was eventually replaced in January 2009 by a general-purpose diesel-powered articulated bus. With only seven operational trolleybuses, the system's fleet reached its all-time low at that time. The reason for the withdrawal of no. 114 from service was a fire in the grounds of the system's depot, due to a technical malfunction in the vehicle's auxiliary motor.

Some of the second generation trolleybuses had their rollsigns replaced in their twilight years of service with modern dot-matrix displays.

Third generation (Swisstrolley) 
Due to their advanced age, the second generation vehicles, which were of high-floor configuration, were replaced in 2011 by seven low-floor Carrosserie Hess articulated trolleybuses of type Swisstrolley 3 (fleet nos. 101 to 107). The City of Schaffhausen had decided on 20 April 2010 to order these new vehicles, at a total cost of 10.5 million Swiss francs.

The first two Swisstrolleys arrived in Schaffhausen on 29 June 2011, and the last followed in September 2011. Six of these units are needed for normal operation of line 1, and the seventh vehicle is a reserve.

See also

List of trolleybus systems in Switzerland

References

Notes

Further reading

External links

 Stadtarchivs Schaffhausen  – extensive image collection
 Schaffhausen: SBB und mehr Teil 1 – illustrated reportage by Rolf Koestner, 1990 
 Swiss Trolleybuses - Schaffhausen – illustrated reportage by Gerry Cork, 2003
 
 

This article is based upon a translation of the German language version as at October 2012.

Schaffhausen
Schaffhausen
Schaffhausen
1966 establishments in Switzerland